Clifford Odame (born 1946) is a Ghanaian former footballer. He competed in the men's tournament at the 1972 Summer Olympics.

References

External links
 
 

1946 births
Living people
Ghanaian footballers
Ghana international footballers
Olympic footballers of Ghana
Footballers at the 1972 Summer Olympics
Asante Kotoko S.C. players
Place of birth missing (living people)
Association football defenders